Fabien Mutombora (born 7 April 1997) is a Burundian footballer who plays as a goalkeeper for Vipers SC and the Burundi national football team.

Early life
Mutombora was born in Rohero, Bujumbura, Burundi.

Club career
After playing for LLB Académic in Burundi, Mutombora signed for Vipers SC of the Uganda Premier League in August 2018 on a three-year deal. He signed a three-year contract extension with the club in October 2020.

International career
Mutombora made his international debut in a friendly against Djibouti on 13 March 2017.

References

External links
 

1997 births
Living people
Burundian footballers
Sportspeople from Bujumbura
Association football goalkeepers
Vipers SC players
Uganda Premier League players
Burundi Premier League players
Burundi international footballers
Burundian expatriate footballers
Expatriate footballers in Uganda
Burundian expatriate sportspeople in Uganda